Eden was a 513-ton merchant ship built upon the Thames River, England in 1826. She made two voyages transporting convicts from England to Australia.

Career
Under the command of Alexander Mollison and surgeon Gilbert King, she left Portsmouth, England on 31 August 1836, with 280 male convicts. She arrived in Hobart Town on 22 December 1836 and had three deaths en route. Eden departed Hobart Town on 7 January 1837, arriving on 14 January 1837 with 22 prisoners from Cape of Good Hope. She left Port Jackson on 2 February 1837 bound for Batavia.

On her second convict voyage under the command of Henry Naylor and surgeon George Freeman, she left Sheerness, England on 10 July 1840, with 270 male convicts. She arrived in Sydney on 18 November and had one death en route. Eden departed Port Jackson in February 1841, bound for Batavia.

Citations

References
Bateson, Charles, The Convict Ships, 1787–1868, Sydney, 1974. 
Llyod's Register (1830)

1826 ships
Ships built on the River Thames
Age of Sail merchant ships
Merchant ships of the United Kingdom
Convict ships to New South Wales
Convict ships to Tasmania